Charles Seth Corcoran is a United States Air Force major general who most recently served as the acting deputy chief of staff for operations of the United States Air Force from July 2022 to December 2022, and most recently served as the assistant deputy chief of staff for operations from July 2021 to July 2022. He also served as the commander of the United States Air Force Warfare Center. Previously, he was the director of operations, strategic deterrence and nuclear integration of the United States Air Forces in Europe – Air Forces Africa.

References

Living people
Place of birth missing (living people)
Recipients of the Legion of Merit
United States Air Force generals
Year of birth missing (living people)